U.S. Route 281 (US 281) is a United States Numbered Highway that runs from the Mexican border in the Rio Grande Valley to the Canadian border near Dunseith, North Dakota. In the state of Texas, the highway is a major south–north corridor, connecting Brownsville to the Oklahoma state line at the Red River in Burkburnett. Several segments of U.S. 281 are concurrent with Interstate routes, including I-69C in the Rio Grande Valley, I-37 in San Antonio, and I-44 north of Wichita Falls.

Route description
US 281 has two signed segments near its southern terminus in the Rio Grande Valley, both of which are signed west–east. The western segment, officially listed as a spur connection by TxDOT and often labeled on maps as US 281 Spur, begins just north of the McAllen–Hidalgo–Reynosa International Bridge in Hidalgo and travels north along International Boulevard before turning east onto Coma Avenue and entering Pharr. The two segments (along with Spur 600, which provides access to the Pharr–Reynosa International Bridge) meet at Cage Boulevard, where signage changes to south–north, and the highway turns to the north. North of the interchange with I-2, US 281 is concurrent with I-69C to that route's northern terminus in Edinburg. US 281 travels through small towns and sparsely-populated areas, alternating between a divided highway and a main street and passing through a Border Patrol checkpoint south of Falfurrias, until joining I-37 north of Three Rivers. The two routes split south of Pleasanton and separately travel northward to San Antonio.

In San Antonio, US 281 overlaps I-410 on the south side of the city until another interchange with I-37. US 281 and I-37 then overlap north into Downtown San Antonio until I-37 ends at I-35. US 281 continues north from Downtown San Antonio as the McAllister Freeway, intersecting I-410 again at a stack interchange in Uptown San Antonio, with access to the San Antonio International Airport. The freeway ends at Loop 1604, and US 281 continues through Bexar County as a superstreet. In Central Texas, it serves as the main street of Blanco before beginning a concurrency with US 290 south of Johnson City. As US 290 continues toward Austin, US 281 and US 290 provide a scenic and less congested alternative to I-35 between San Antonio and Austin. The two routes split in the city, with US 281 continuing toward Marble Falls, Burnet, and Lampasas.

North of Stephenville, US 281 crosses I-20 and continues through North Central Texas, passing through Mineral Wells and Jacksboro. Upon reaching Wichita Falls, US 281 becomes a freeway. It begins a concurrency with I-44 at that route's western terminus, and the two routes travel north, crossing the Red River into Oklahoma near Burkburnett.

History

A project to construct a stack interchange at I-410 (the "San Antonio Web") was completed June 9, 2008; formerly there was no direct access between the two freeways and surface streets were required to travel between the freeways.  The reason for this initial lack of direct interchange was due to litigation filed in the late 1960s against the Texas Highway Department over the highway's original construction alignment through portions of Brackenridge Park and Olmos Park that were alleged to be in violation of several Federal laws, ultimately including NEPA.  As a result of the Supreme Court decision in a more advanced and very similar case involving the proposed construction of I-40 through Overton Park in Memphis, Tennessee which upheld and affirmed the plaintiffs in that circumstance and precluded that highway's construction through the parkland with Federal funding, the Texas Highway Department chose instead to construct the McAlister Freeway entirely with State funding using a modified design that would increase curvature but limit encroachment into and noise impact on the Sunken Gardens area within Brackenridge Park.  Funding of various highway projects from around Texas was re-allocated to the McAlister Freeway project, which was initially completed with only the indirect interchange via existing surface streets to Loop 410 since it required no Federal funding or approval and the Loop 410 overpass of that location where the McAlister Freeway main lanes would pass beneath had already been completed many years earlier.

In 2010, US 281 from Loop 1604 to Bulverde Road in north San Antonio was re-constructed as a superstreet. Groundbreaking was held on March 11, 2010 with construction finishing later that year in September.

The highway was expanded from a two-lane highway to a four-lane divided highway from River Crossing to the Comal-Blanco county line at a cost of $30.5 million.

Future
The section of US 281 from I-2/US 83 in Pharr to George West is steadily being upgraded to an interstate-grade freeway as part of the Interstate 69 expansion, and will be signed as Interstate 69C. The bypass for Premont is under construction scheduled for completion in 2024. 

The section of US 281 from Loop 1604 to the Bexar–Comal county line currently experiences heavy congestion during peak hours, being the most congested highway in Bexar County. TxDOT is upgrading this section of highway from a superstreet to a limited–access freeway, with construction beginning in 2017 and concluding in 2022. Section 1, from Loop 1604 to Stone Oak Parkway, is planned to be constructed from 2017 to 2020. Section 2, from Stone Oak Parkway to Borgfeld Drive, is planned to be constructed from 2019 to 2022. The project will cost $532 million. Ground breaking for the project was held on March 31, 2017 with construction officially beginning on July 17.

Major intersections

U.S. Route 281 Spur

See also

 List of U.S. Highways in Texas
 List of highways numbered 281

Notes

References

External links

81-2
Freeways in Texas
 Texas
Transportation in San Antonio
Transportation in Bexar County, Texas
Transportation in Cameron County, Texas
Transportation in Hidalgo County, Texas
Transportation in Brooks County, Texas
Transportation in Jim Wells County, Texas
Transportation in Live Oak County, Texas
Transportation in Atascosa County, Texas
Transportation in Comal County, Texas
Transportation in Blanco County, Texas
Transportation in Burnet County, Texas
Transportation in Lampasas County, Texas
Transportation in Coryell County, Texas
Transportation in Hamilton County, Texas
Transportation in Erath County, Texas
Transportation in Palo Pinto County, Texas
Transportation in Jack County, Texas
Transportation in Archer County, Texas
Transportation in Wichita County, Texas